Daniel Joseph "Brum" O'Meara (16 September 1908 – 7 November 1985) was an Australian rules footballer who played for Fitzroy and South Melbourne in the VFL during the 1930s.

Football
O'Meara played as a centreman and half forward and debuted for South Melbourne in their premiership year of 1933, after being recruited from West Australia. The collection of players recruited from interstate in 1932/1933 became known as South Melbourne's "Foreign Legion".

He played on the half forward flank in the Grand Final and remained with the club until partway through the 1936 season when he crossed to Fitzroy.

See also
 1927 Melbourne Carnival

Notes

References
 World War Two Nominal Roll: Private Daniel Joseph O'Meara, Department of Veterans' Affairs.
 "Brum" O'Meara, The (Perth) Truth, (Saturday, 2 July 1927), p.12.
 Melbourne League Football — the South Melbourne Team, The Weekly Times, (Saturday, 19 May 1934), p.37.

External links
 
 
 Jim O'Meara at Boyles Football Photos.

1908 births
1985 deaths
Australian rules footballers from Western Australia
Sydney Swans players
Sydney Swans Premiership players
Fitzroy Football Club players
East Perth Football Club players
Kalgoorlie Railways Football Club players
One-time VFL/AFL Premiership players